The year 1792 in architecture involved some significant events.

Buildings and structures

Buildings

 May 16 – La Fenice theatre in Venice, designed by Gianantonio Selva, is inaugurated with an opera performance.
 August 22–31 – Columbus Obelisk in Baltimore, Maryland.
 October 13 – Work begins on the White House, designed by James Hoban, in Washington, D.C.
 Alexander Palace in Tsarskoye Selo, Russia is built.
 Church of St John-at-Hackney in London, designed by James Spiller, is built.
 Stenbock House in Tallinn, designed by Johann Caspar Mohr, is completed.
 The Old State House (Connecticut) in Hartford is probably designed by Charles Bulfinch (his first commission for a public building).
 Manjarabad fort in India is built.
 Sir John Soane begins work on his house in London, which becomes the Soane Museum.

Awards
 Grand Prix de Rome, architecture: Pierre-Charles-Joseph Normand.

Births
 June 15 – Philip Hardwick, English architect (died 1870)
 August 20 – Jakob Ignaz Hittorff, Franco-German architect who supervises changes at the Palais Beauharnais in Paris (died 1867)
 Thomas Deane, Irish architect (died 1871)

Deaths
 March 3 – Robert Adam, Scottish-born neoclassical architect and interior and furniture designer (born 1728)
 October 28 – John Smeaton, English civil engineer (born 1724)

Architecture
Years in architecture
18th-century architecture